Freddy Peralta Diaz (born June 4, 1996) is a Dominican professional baseball pitcher for the Milwaukee Brewers of Major League Baseball (MLB).

Early life
Freddy Peralta was born in Moca, Dominican Republic, on June 4, 1996, to Pedro Peralta and Octavia Diaz.

Career

Seattle Mariners
Peralta signed with the Seattle Mariners as an international free agent in April 2013. He made his professional debut that year with the Dominican Summer League Mariners and spent the whole season there, going 3-3 with a 1.46 ERA in 13 games (ten starts). In 2014, he pitched for the Arizona League Mariners where he pitched to a 1-6 record and 5.29 ERA in 12 starts, and in 2015, he returned there, going 2-3 with a 4.11 ERA in 11 games (nine starts).

Milwaukee Brewers
On December 9, 2015 the Mariners traded Peralta, Daniel Missaki and Carlos Herrera to the Milwaukee Brewers for Adam Lind. He spent 2016 with the Wisconsin Timber Rattlers and the Biloxi Shuckers, pitching to a combined 4-4 record and 3.62 ERA in 82 innings pitched.

Peralta pitched 2017 with the Carolina Mudcats and Biloxi. In 25 games (19 starts) between the two clubs he was 3-8 with a 2.63 ERA and 1.16 WHIP. The Brewers added him to their 40-man roster after the season. MLB.com ranked Peralta as Milwaukee's tenth ranked prospect going into the 2018 season.

Peralta began 2018 with the Colorado Springs Sky Sox and was called up to Milwaukee on May 13 to make his MLB debut. He debuted that same night against the Colorado Rockies at Coors Field. He recorded 13 strikeouts and gave up zero runs in 5.2 innings, setting the Brewers franchise record for strikeouts by a first time starter. For the season, he was 6-4 with a 4.25	ERA. Of all MLB pitchers, he held right-handed batters to the lowest batting average, .110 (in 30 or more innings). In 2019 for the Brewers, Peralta made 39 appearances for the club, registering a 7-3 record and 5.29 ERA with 115 strikeouts in 85.0 innings of work. 

On February 28, 2020, Peralta and the Brewers agreed to a five-year, $15.5MM contract extension. In 2020, Peralta made 15 appearances for the Brew Crew, pitching to a 3-1 record and a 3.99 ERA with 47 strikeouts in 29.1 innings pitched. In 2021, Peralta made 28 appearances for the Brewers, pitching to a 10-5 record and a 2.81 ERA with 195 strikeouts in 144.1 innings pitched.

On June 14, 2022, Peralta was placed on the 60-day injured list with a lat injury.

Personal life
Peralta and his wife, Maritza, have one daughter together.

References

External links 

1996 births
Living people
Arizona League Mariners players
Biloxi Shuckers players
Brevard County Manatees players
Carolina Mudcats players
Colorado Springs Sky Sox players
Dominican Republic expatriate baseball players in the United States
Dominican Summer League Mariners players
Major League Baseball players from the Dominican Republic
Major League Baseball pitchers
Milwaukee Brewers players
People from Espaillat Province
San Antonio Missions players
Toros del Este players
Wisconsin Timber Rattlers players
Nashville Sounds players